Secret Agent Super Dragon (Italian: New York chiama Superdrago) is a 1966  international co-production Eurospy film directed by Giorgio Ferroni and starring Ray Danton as the titular secret agent.

Plot 
The plot centers on a secret agent and an evil organization that is drugging people for world domination. After his colleague is killed, the eponymous Secret Agent Super Dragon comes out of retirement to investigate. The main character discovers that the culprits in this crime are actually part of an international crime syndicate, and that they are smuggling the drugs in imported vases.

Cast 
Ray Danton as Bryan Cooper (Super Dragon)
Marisa Mell as Charity Farrel
Margaret Lee as Cynthia Fulton
Jess Hahn as Baby Face
Carlo D'Angelo as Fernand Lamas
Adriana Ambesi as Verna
Marco Guglielmi as Professor Kurge
Solvi Stubing as Elizabeth
Gérard Herter as Coleman
Jacques Herlin as Ross
Benito Stefanelli as Kirk

Release
Secret Agent Super Dragon was released in France on May 24, 1966.

References

External links 
 
 New York chiama Superdrago at Variety Distribution
MST3K info

1966 films
Italian spy thriller films
Films directed by Giorgio Ferroni
1960s spy thriller films
Films set in Amsterdam
Films set in New York City
Films about drugs
French spy thriller films
German spy thriller films
Films scored by Benedetto Ghiglia
Parody films based on James Bond films
1960s Italian films
1960s French films
1960s German films